Lucas da Silva Izidoro (born 24 Fevereiro 1996), known as Lucas Mineiro, is a Brazilian footballer who plays as a midfielder for Belgian club Westerlo on loan from the Portuguese club Braga.

Club career
Born in Belo Horizonte, Minas Gerais, Lucas started his career at Villa Nova (being also known as Dodô), and made his senior debut on 8 March 2015 by coming on as a second half substitute in a 0–0 Campeonato Mineiro home draw against América Mineiro. In August, after two Série D appearances, he joined Chapecoense, returning to youth setup.

Lucas made his Série A debut on 11 June 2016, replacing Dener in a 1–2 away loss against Ponte Preta. He did not board LaMia Airlines Flight 2933 for the 2016 Copa Sudamericana Finals, which crashed and killed 19 of his teammates.

Career statistics

Honours
Chapecoense
Campeonato Catarinense: 2016, 2017

References

External links

1995 births
Footballers from Belo Horizonte
Living people
Brazilian footballers
Association football midfielders
Villa Nova Atlético Clube players
Associação Chapecoense de Futebol players
Associação Atlética Ponte Preta players
CR Vasco da Gama players
Cerezo Osaka players
Gil Vicente F.C. players
S.C. Braga players
K.V.C. Westerlo players
Campeonato Brasileiro Série A players
Campeonato Brasileiro Série B players
Campeonato Brasileiro Série D players
J1 League players
Primeira Liga players
Belgian Pro League players
Brazilian expatriate footballers
Expatriate footballers in Japan
Brazilian expatriate sportspeople in Japan
Expatriate footballers in Portugal
Brazilian expatriate sportspeople in Portugal
Expatriate footballers in Belgium
Brazilian expatriate sportspeople in Belgium